Maniltoa rosea is a species of flowering plants in the family Fabaceae. It belongs to the subfamily Detarioideae.

References

rosea